The 2005 Las Vegas Desert Classic was the 2005 edition of the Las Vegas Desert Classic darts tournament on 27 June until 3 July 2005. It was held at the MGM Grand Las Vegas, and was won by Phil Taylor.

Qualified Players

Pro Qualified players

Qualifiers

Prize Fund

Results

Men's tournament

Women's tournament

References

2005
2005 in darts
MGM Grand Las Vegas